Airdrie-Chestermere was a provincial electoral district in Alberta, Canada, mandated to return a single member to the Legislative Assembly of Alberta using the first-past-the-post method of voting from 2004 to 2012.

History
The district was located to the east of Calgary in southern Alberta. It was created in the 2003 electoral boundary re-distribution from the old riding of Airdrie-Rocky View. The riding has an urban rural mix. It was named after the City of Airdrie and the City of Chestermere. The riding also covered Crossfield and the eastern half of Rocky View County as well as border areas of Calgary that have grown beyond into the district.

The voters in the district and its antecedents primarily supported Progressive Conservative candidates in the past, but other right leaning parties polled well. The first representative was Progressive Conservative Carol Haley who had previously represented Airdrie-Rocky View, and the second was Rob Anderson who was elected as a Progressive Conservative in 2008 but crossed the floor to the Wildrose Alliance in early 2010.

The riding was abolished in the 2010 Alberta boundary re-distribution prior to the 2012 Alberta general election. The territory of the Aridrie-Chestermere district was divided amongst three new electoral districts, the northeast portion including Beiseker and Irricana was transferred to Olds-Didsbury-Three Hills electoral district, the territory covering the City of Airdrie and surrounding rural lands to the Airdrie electoral district, and the remainder to the Chestermere-Rocky View electoral district.

Boundary history

Electoral history
The electoral district was created in the 2004 boundary redistribution. The first election held that year saw Progressive Conservative incumbent Carol Haley who had previously represented the old ridings of Three Hills-Airdrie and Airdrie-Rocky View win the seat with a landslide over a crowded field of seven other candidates. She retired from office at dissolution in 2008.

The 2008 election saw Progressive Conservative candidate Rob Anderson sweep to office. He crossed the floor to the Wildrose Alliance on January 4, 2010 citing dissatisfaction with the Progressive Conservative government and Premier Ed Stelmach.

Election results

2004 general election

2008 general election

Senate election results

2004 Senate nominee election district results

Voters had the option of selecting 4 candidates on the ballot.

2004 student vote

On November 19, 2004, a student vote was conducted at participating Alberta schools to parallel the 2004 Alberta general election results. The vote was designed to educate students and simulate the electoral process for persons who had not yet reached the legal majority. The vote was conducted in 80 of the 83 provincial electoral districts, with students voting for actual election candidates. Schools with a large student body who resided in another electoral district had the option to vote for candidates outside of the electoral district than where they were physically located.

See also
List of Alberta provincial electoral districts

References

External links
Elections Alberta
The Legislative Assembly of Alberta
CBC's election coverage 2004

Airdrie, Alberta
Former provincial electoral districts of Alberta